Brad Mooar (born 28-Aug-1974) is a New Zealand professional rugby union coach. He was previously assistant coach at Southern Kings and Crusaders and was head coach at the Scarlets in Wales.

References

Living people
New Zealand rugby union coaches
Scarlets coaches
1974 births